Pat O'Connor (born December 17, 1960, in St. Louis) is an American politician who served in the Missouri House of Representatives from  1992 to 2002.  He was elected as a Democrat, and left office due to term limits.  In his final term, O'Connor was the chair of the Motor Vehicle and Traffic Regulations Committee and a member of the Labor Committee and the Professional Registration and Licensing Committee.

O'Connor attended Hazelwood West High School and University of Missouri–St. Louis.

References

Democratic Party members of the Missouri House of Representatives
Living people
1960 births